The Ninety Mile Desert is an area in the Australian state of South Australia.  It is described either as a desert or as a plain and which has been officially known as Coonalpyn Downs since 1949.

References

Deserts of South Australia